Massachusetts House of Representatives' 15th Middlesex district in the United States is one of 160 legislative districts included in the lower house of the Massachusetts General Court. It covers part of Middlesex County. Democrat Michelle Ciccolo of Lexington has represented the district since 2019.

Locales represented
The district includes the following localities:
 Lexington
 part of Woburn

The current district geographic boundary overlaps with those of the Massachusetts Senate's 3rd Middlesex and 4th Middlesex districts.

Former locales
The district previously covered:
 Ashland, circa 1872 
 Hopkinton, circa 1872

Representatives
 Leander E. Wakefield, circa 1858 
 John Phelps, circa 1859 
 Samuel Walker McCall, circa 1888 
 Henry Achin Jr., circa 1920 
 Adelard Berard, circa 1920 
 Victor Francis Jewett, circa 1920 
 Cornelius Desmond, Jr., circa 1951 
 James Lawrence Odea, Jr., circa 1951 
 Patrick Francis Plunkett, circa 1951 
 Richard Edward Landry, circa 1975 
 Lincoln Porteous Cole, Jr.
 Stephen W. Doran, 1981-1995 
 Jay R. Kaufman
 Michelle Ciccolo, 2019-current

See also
 List of Massachusetts House of Representatives elections
 List of Massachusetts General Courts
 List of former districts of the Massachusetts House of Representatives
 Other Middlesex County districts of the Massachusetts House of Representatives: 1st, 2nd, 3rd, 4th, 5th, 6th, 7th, 8th, 9th, 10th, 11th, 12th, 13th, 14th, 16th, 17th, 18th, 19th, 20th, 21st, 22nd, 23rd, 24th, 25th, 26th, 27th, 28th, 29th, 30th, 31st, 32nd, 33rd, 34th, 35th, 36th, 37th

Images
Portraits of legislators

References

External links
 Ballotpedia
  (State House district information based on U.S. Census Bureau's American Community Survey).
 League of Women Voters of Lexington (MA)

House
Government of Middlesex County, Massachusetts